Devarim may refer to:

 The Hebrew title of the biblical Book of Deuteronomy
 Devarim (parsha), the 44th weekly parsha in the annual Jewish cycle of Torah readings

See also
 Devarim Rabbah is the midrash about the Book of Deuteronomy
 Devarim Zutta is a midrash to Deuteronomy which is no longer extant

Hebrew words and phrases in the Hebrew Bible